Nanodacna indiscriminata is a moth of the family Agonoxenidae. It is found on the Juan Fernández Islands.

References

Moths described in 1965
Agonoxeninae
Moths of South America